Kauriram is a village in Mohania block of Kaimur district, Bihar, India. It is located southeast of Mohania, on the Grand Trunk Road. As of 2011, its population was 2,269, in 331 households.

References 

Villages in Kaimur district